A Letter from Home is a 1941 British short documentary film directed by Carol Reed. It was nominated for an Academy Award for Best Documentary Short.

Cast
 Joyce Grenfell as American Mother
 Kathleen Harrison as The Maid
 Celia Johnson as English Mother
 Edie Martin as Bespectacled shopper

References

External links

1941 films
1941 documentary films
1941 short films
British short documentary films
British black-and-white films
Black-and-white documentary films
Films directed by Carol Reed
1940s short documentary films
20th Century Fox films
1940s English-language films
1940s British films